Kitatites is an extinct genus of Upper Devonian (Frasnian) cephalopods named by  Zhuravleva, 1972. It is assigned to the nautiloid order Discosorida.

References  

 Jack Sepkoski's list of Cephalopod genera, 

Prehistoric nautiloid genera
Discosorida